Megafobia is a wooden roller coaster located at Oakwood Theme Park, Pembrokeshire, Wales, United Kingdom. It opened on 30 April 1996 and was built by Custom Coasters International, who wanted a ride to showcase their company in Europe. Megafobia features a twister style layout.

Megafobia was the first major attraction to be installed at Oakwood Theme Park (then Oakwood Leisure Park) in West Wales and transformed the park's fortunes from a small family leisure park to a major UK theme park. Until the construction of Wicker Man commenced at Alton Towers in 2017, it was also the most recent wooden roller coaster to be built in the UK. On 30 April 2016 it celebrated 20 years at Oakwood. The standard speed of Megafobia is 48mph.

Ride experience
Out of the station, trains make a left turn and small dip before climbing the 85 foot tall lift hill. At the top, the track makes a 180 degree left turn, before diving down the first drop. The first drop passes through the structure, and is followed by a sweeping left curve and an airtime hill crossing over the lift hill. After this airtime hill, the track hits a 180 degree left turn, to face back towards the lift hill. The camera is situated at the exit of this turn. The track heads back towards the lift hill, passing over an airtime hill and drop that cross under the lift hill and over the first drop. The track then makes a three-quarter right turn that passes through the lift hill's structure. Leaving the lift hill structure, the train passes through an airtime hill and crosses over the exit from the first turnaround before turning around on a 180 degree right turn and drop. The track weaves under itself and traces back along the earlier pass through the lift hill structure before making a drop and turn to the right. After passing under the second hill, the track makes another right turn and then makes another drop before hitting the final brake run. Trains then pass through the transfer track and storage area before returning to the station.

2023 retrack
On 27 January 2023, the park announced that Megafobia will be undergoing a $2M retrack by The Gravity Group, with 40% of the track to be replaced and the first drop will be reprofiled which will make it steeper. The park expects work to be completed by early May.

Awards 
Megafobia has consistently been rated among the top wooden coasters in the Golden Ticket Awards. The roller-coaster did not feature in the awards in 2020.

References

External links 
Megafobia at Oakwood's website

Roller coasters in the United Kingdom
Roller coasters introduced in 1996